NBA Entertainment is the production arm of the National Basketball Association (NBA) and produces many NBA-related films including team championship videos and blooper and entertainment reels. Founded in 1982, it used to be associated with CBS/Fox Video, which was signing an agreement in 1987, before changing its distribution partner to Warner Bros. whose Turner Sports division runs its website and is one of its major broadcast partners.

Films produced by NBA Entertainment
The Dynasty Renewed: 1981 NBA Playoffs and Finals 1981
Something to Prove: 1982 NBA Playoffs and Finals 1982
That Championship Feeling: 1983 NBA Playoffs and Finals 1983
Pride And Passion: 1984 NBA Playoffs and Finals 1984
Return To Glory: 1985 NBA Playoffs and Finals 1985
Sweet Sixteen: 1986 NBA Playoffs and Finals 1986
Home of the Brave: The 1986-87 Boston Celtics
The Drive for Five: The 1986-87 Los Angeles Lakers
Basketball's Air Force: The 1986-87 Atlanta Hawks
Hanging Tough: The 1986-87 Houston Rockets
Higher Ground: The 1987-88 Chicago Bulls 1988
Bad Boys: The 1987-88 Detroit Pistons 1988
Back to Back: The 1987-88 Los Angeles Lakers 1988
Michael Jordan: Come Fly With Me 1988
Dazzling Dunks and Basketball Bloopers 1988
NBA Awesome Endings 1989
NBA Superstars 1989
Kareem: Reflections From Inside 1989
New York's Game: The History of The New York Knicks 1989
History of the NBA 1989
The All New Dazzling Dunks and Basketball Bloopers 1989 (Note: this show featured a parody of the History of the NBA called the Unofficial History of the NBA).
Return to Rip City: The 1989-90 Portland Trail Blazers
Pure Pistons: The 1989-90 Detroit Pistons
Sports Illustrated Presents Milestones: Record Breakers of the NBA 1990
Sports Illustrated Presents Champions: The NBA Greatest Teams 1990
Sports Illustrated Presents Classic Confrontations in the NBA 1990
Michael Jordan's Playground 1990
Learning to Fly: The 1990-91 Chicago Bulls 1991
Super Slams of the NBA 1991
Larry Bird: A Basketball Legend 1991
Magic Johnson: Always Showtime 1991 (Note: this film would be updated in 1996 to include his first retirement, his 1992 Olympic experience and his return to the NBA in 1996).
NBA Superstars 2 1992
Untouchabulls: The 1991-92 Chicago Bulls 1992
NBA Dream Team 1992
Silver Streak: The First 25 Years of the Phoenix Suns 1992
Michael Jordan: Air Time 1993
NBA Jam Session 1993
Three-Peat: The 1992-93 Chicago Bulls 1993
NBA Guts and Glory 1993
Patrick Ewing Standing Tall 1993
Sir Charles 1994
Clutch City: The 1993-94 Houston Rockets 1994
NBA Below the Rim 1995
NBA Jams: The Music Videos 1995
Double Clutch: The 1994-95 Houston Rockets
NBA Legacy: Living Legends to Rising Stars 1995
NBA Furious Finishes 1996
Michael Jordan: Above and Beyond 1996
UnStop-a-Bulls: The 1995-96 Chicago Bulls 1996
Space Jam (animated by Warner Bros. Feature Animation) 1996
NBA In the Paint 1997
Unforgettabulls: The 1997-98 Chicago Bulls 1998
Go Spurs Go: San Antonio Spurs 1998-1999 NBA Champions
Like Mike 2002

References

Entertainment
Mass media in Hudson County, New Jersey
Companies based in Hudson County, New Jersey